Beth Sholom Congregation is a Conservative synagogue located at 8231 Old York Road in the Philadelphia suburb of Elkins Park, Pennsylvania. It is the only synagogue designed by famed architect Frank Lloyd Wright. Beth Sholom is Hebrew for House of Peace.  Completed in 1959, it has been called a "startling, translucent, modernist evocation of an ancient temple, transposed to a Philadelphia suburb by Frank Lloyd Wright.  It was designated a National Historic Landmark in 2007 for its architecture.

Congregation

The congregation originally established a synagogue in the Logan neighborhood of Philadelphia in 1919. It was one of the first congregations to move to the suburbs at its present home in the 1950s.
Bernard Wolfman, Dean of the University of Pennsylvania Law School, and his family attended the synagogue.

Clergy

Rabbis
 1919–1964: Rabbi Mortimer J. Cohen 
 1964–2000: Rabbi Aaron Landes
 2000–2003: Rabbi Gershon Schwartz
 2003–2004: Rabbi Frederic Kazan (interim)
 2004–present: Rabbi David Glanzberg-Krainin
 2004–present: Rabbi Andrea Merow

Cantors
1957–1967: Cantor Seymour Schwartzman
1968–1971: Cantor Neil Newman
1971–1975: Cantor Robert H. Albert
1975–2011: Cantor David F. Tilman
2012 - 2014: No full time Cantor
2014–2019: Cantor Jeffrey Weber
2020-present: Cantor Jacob Agar

Building
The building was designed by Frank Lloyd Wright, who accepted the commission in September 1953. The building was completed and consecrated in 1959. It has been cited as an example of the Mayan Revival architecture style. With its steeply inclined walls of translucent  corrugated wire glass, it projects skyward like a "luminous Mount Sinai" (Wright's own description). The ceiling is a fiberglass material. Neither material was designed by Wright. A sample of the roof is on display in the visitor center. No modifications have been made to the exterior since initial construction.

During the day, the interior is lit by natural light entering through the translucent walls overhead. At night, the entire building glows from interior artificial lighting.
In ancient days, the laver (from the word "to lave," or "wash"), in which people washed their hands before worship, would have been made of copper. The ornamental fountain with flowing waters in front of the entrance is a symbol of the old laver and is also a symbol of purity upon entering into worship.

The main sanctuary is large enough to hold about 1020 people.  The second sanctuary, which holds over 250 people, is on the first floor of the synagogue.  Rabbi Mortimer Cohen had requested the main sanctuary be on the second floor to be lit by natural light during the day. The roof is 110 feet from floor to ceiling, giving the impression of rising towards the heavens. In 2009 the congregation opened a visitor center. Tours are given by docents several days a week.

In 2015 an elevator was added. 

The design has been considered by critics to be the "most expressive" design drafted in Wright's career for any house of worship.  In 1960, it was listed by the American Institute of Architects as one of the 17 American buildings which are to be preserved as an example of Wright's contribution to American architecture.

Gallery

See also

List of National Historic Landmarks in Pennsylvania
National Register of Historic Places listings in Montgomery County, Pennsylvania

References

Further reading
 Siry, Joseph M. Beth Sholom Synagogue: Frank Lloyd Wright and Modern Religious Architecture (University of Chicago Press, 2011) 705 pp.
 Storrer, William Allin. The Frank Lloyd Wright Companion. University Of Chicago Press, 2006,  (S.373).

External links

Official Congregation homepage
Beth Sholom Preservation Foundation
Beth Sholom  | The Museum of the Jewish People at Beit Hatfutsot
Architectural details
Photos on Arcaid

Frank Lloyd Wright buildings
Conservative synagogues in Pennsylvania
Elkins Park, Pennsylvania
Religious buildings and structures in Montgomery County, Pennsylvania
National Historic Landmarks in Pennsylvania
National Register of Historic Places in Montgomery County, Pennsylvania
Synagogues on the National Register of Historic Places in Pennsylvania
Tourist attractions in Montgomery County, Pennsylvania
Jewish organizations established in 1919
1919 establishments in Pennsylvania
1959 establishments in Pennsylvania
Synagogues completed in 1959
Modernist architecture in Pennsylvania